Georgia College & State University (Georgia College or GC) is a public liberal arts university in Milledgeville, Georgia. The university enrolls approximately 7,000 students and is a member of the University System of Georgia and the Council of Public Liberal Arts Colleges. Georgia College was designated Georgia's "Public Liberal Arts University" in 1996 by the Georgia Board of Regents.

Students pursue majors and graduate degree programs throughout the university's four colleges: College of Arts & Sciences, J. Whitney Bunting College of Business and Technology, John H. Lounsbury College of Education, and College of Health Sciences. Georgia College Athletics' 11 teams compete in the NCAA Division II Peach Belt Conference.

History 
Georgia College was chartered in 1889 as Georgia Normal and Industrial College. Its emphasis at the time was largely vocational, and its major task was to prepare young women for teaching or industrial careers. In 1917, in keeping with economic and cultural changes in the state, Georgia Normal and Industrial College was authorized to grant 4-year degrees, the first of which was awarded in 1921. In 1922, the institution's name was changed to Georgia State College for Women. The university has been a unit of the University System of Georgia since the system's founding in 1932. Mary "Flannery" O'Connor entered as a freshman in 1942. Active in student publications, she graduated three years later and became one of the South's most noted writers. Also during World War II, Georgia State College for Women served as one of four colleges that trained WAVES for the U.S. Navy. After the war, enrollment declined as women preferred co-educational colleges. The name was changed to Woman's College of Georgia in 1961, and, when the institution became coeducational in 1967, it became Georgia College at Milledgeville. The name was shortened to Georgia College in 1971. In August 1996, the Board of Regents approved a change of name to Georgia College & State University, and a new mission as Georgia's Public Liberal Arts University.

Campus 

The campus contains buildings of red brick and white Corinthian columns, representative of those constructed during the pre-Civil War Antebellum period, when Milledgeville was the capital of Georgia. Bell Hall and Russell Auditorium are credited to architect J. Reginald MacEachron. Atkinson Hall (1896) is listed on the National Register of Historic Places. Other historic buildings on the campus include Sanford Hall (1938), Russell Auditorium (1926), Ina Dillard Russell Art Museum (the original section of the library) (1932), Chappell Hall (1963) (on the site of an earlier Chappell Hall built in 1907), Parks Hall (1911), Terrell Hall (1908), Maxwell Student Union (1972), Beeson Hall (1937), Porter Hall (1939), Lanier Hall (1926), Ennis Hall (1920), and Herty Hall (1954 and expanded in 1972).

Most of the university's residence halls are located a block from central campus along with the sports complex, called the Centennial Center. The Old Governor's Mansion is also within walking distance of the residence halls and front campus. West Campus, a  extension  from the central campus, contains The Village student apartments and athletic fields. In addition, GC operates a large recreational area on Lake Laurel (approximately 5 minutes from the central campus) which is used by students in the university's Environmental Science and Outdoor Education programs.

The university library houses the manuscript collection of author Flannery O'Connor, an alumna of the university, and of U.S. Senator Paul Coverdell, whose career included serving as director of the Peace Corps when the Berlin Wall fell.

Athletics

Known as the Georgia College Bobcats, the college is currently a member of NCAA Division II and the Peach Belt Conference. Georgia College sponsors varsity teams in baseball, men's and women's basketball, men's and women's cheerleading, men's and women's cross country, golf, dance team, women's soccer, softball, men's and women's tennis, women's volleyball, men's and women's esports and collegiate bass fishing.

Student life

Student housing
Georgia College provides housing on campus for students. Students have the option to reside either in a suite-style residence hall on Central Campus or in an apartment at The Village on West Campus.

Greek life
Georgia College has a Greek system with over 21 sororities and fraternities under various councils.

College Panhellenic Council
 Alpha Delta Pi (ΑΔΠ)
 Alpha Gamma Delta (ΑΓΔ)
 Alpha Omicron Pi (ΑΟΠ)
 Delta Gamma (ΔΓ)
 Delta Zeta (ΔΖ)
 Kappa Delta (ΚΔ)
 Phi Mu (ΦΜ)
 Zeta Tau Alpha (ΖΤΑ)

National Pan-Hellenic Council
 Alpha Kappa Alpha (ΑΚΑ)
 Alpha Phi Alpha (ΑΦΑ)
 Delta Sigma Theta (ΔΣΘ)
 Kappa Alpha Psi (ΚΑΨ)
 Omega Psi Phi (ΩΨΦ)
 Phi Beta Sigma (ΦΒΣ)
 Sigma Gamma Rho (ΣΓΡ)
 Zeta Phi Beta (ΖΦΒ)

Interfraternity Council
 Alpha Tau Omega (ΑΤΩ) 
 Delta Sigma Phi (ΔΣΦ)
 Kappa Alpha Order (ΚΑ)
 Kappa Sigma (ΚΣ)
 Pi Kappa Phi (ΠΚΦ)
 Pi Kappa Alpha (ΠΚΑ)
 Theta Chi (ΘΧ)

United Greek Council
 Gamma Sigma Sigma (ΓΣΣ) 
 Lambda Sigma Upsilon (ΛΣΥ)
 Mu Sigma Upsilon (ΜΣΥ)
 Omega Delta Sigma (ΩΔΣ)
 Sigma Alpha Omega (ΣΑΩ)

Student Government Association
Georgia College's Student Government Association (SGA) serves the campus community by addressing student concerns, promoting understanding within the college community, and administering all matters which are delegated to the student government by the university president. The responsibility for the governing of the student body is vested in the students themselves. All students are members of the SGA upon their enrollment, and officers and senators are elected on a yearly basis.

Notable alumni
 Ruth Carter Stapleton, Christian evangelist and sister of former U.S. president Jimmy Carter
 Sherrilyn Kenyon, author
 Rachael Kirkconnell, television personality
 Helen Matthews Lewis, sociologist, historian, and activist
 Tanvi Ganesh Lonkar, actress
 Susan Dowdell Myrick, journalist, educator, author, and conservationist
 Tony Nicely, former CEO of GEICO
 Flannery O'Connor, writer and essayist

See also 
 Arts & Letters
The Center for Innovation at Georgia College and State University

References

External links 
 
 Official athletics website

 
1889 establishments in Georgia (U.S. state)
Buildings and structures in Baldwin County, Georgia
Education in Baldwin County, Georgia
Educational institutions established in 1889
Former women's universities and colleges in the United States
Liberal arts colleges in Georgia (U.S. state)
Universities and colleges accredited by the Southern Association of Colleges and Schools
Public universities and colleges in Georgia (U.S. state)
Public liberal arts colleges in the United States